Volden is a Norwegian surname. Notable people with the surname include:

Brit Volden (born 1960), Norwegian orienteer
Lars Volden (born 1992), Norwegian ice hockey player

See also
Volden Group, Norwegian seafood company
Volden, Aarhus, a street in Aarhus, Denmark

Norwegian-language surnames